César Efraín Gutiérrez Álvarez (born 7 May 1954) is a Honduran football defender who played for Honduras in the 1982 FIFA World Cup.

Club career
Nicknamed Fayito, Gutiérrez played for Pumas UNAH as a rightback.

International career
Gutiérrez represented his country in 9 FIFA World Cup qualification matches and played in two games at the 1982 FIFA World Cup in Spain.

Managerial career
He was Pumas' manager when they lost 0-8 to Platense in 2000. He was the national women's team coach in 2010.

References

External links
 Efraín “Fayito” Gutiérrez: Estamos a un paso de salir del nivel amateur - La Tribuna 

1954 births
Living people
People from La Ceiba
Association football defenders
Honduran footballers
Honduras international footballers
1982 FIFA World Cup players
CONCACAF Championship-winning players